Smith v. United States may refer to:

 Smith v. United States (1993), 508 U.S. 223 (1993), a case about exchanging guns for drugs
 Smith v. United States (2013), 568 U.S. 106 (2013), a case about members leaving a drug conspiracy group
 Smith v. United States (2023)

See also
United States v. Smith (disambiguation)